The Adobe Museum of Digital Media was a virtual museum dedicated to digital art that launched on October 6, 2010. It also provided information on the relationship between digital media and society and was created and sponsored as a marketing exercise by Adobe Systems and produced in partnership with Spin+ and Unit 9.

The museum's exhibitions included a video exhibit by Tony Oursler and a project by Mariko Mori.

As of 2016, the museum is no longer accessible online.

References

External links 

 

Defunct art museums and galleries in California
Adobe Inc.
Digital art
Virtual museums
Art museums established in 2010
2010 establishments in California